Greenmaniella is a genus of flowering plants in the daisy family.

The genus is named in honor of US botanist Jesse More Greenman (1867-1951), formerly of the Missouri Botanical Garden.

Species
There is only one known species, Greenmaniella resinosa, native to the state of Nuevo León in northeastern Mexico.

References

Neurolaeneae
Monotypic Asteraceae genera
Flora of Nuevo León